Luib was a railway station located in Glen Dochart, Stirling (district) midway between Crianlarich and Killin.

History 
This station opened on 1 August 1873, when the Callander and Oban Railway was extended from Glenoglehead to Tyndrum.

The station was laid out with two platforms, one on either side of a crossing loop. There were sidings on the north side of the station.

The station was closed on 27 September 1965 following a landslide in Glen Ogle.

Signalling 
Luib signal box, which replaced the original box on 18 March 1890, was located at the west end of the station, on the north side of the line. It had 14 levers.

References

Sources

External links 
 Luib station on navigable 1925 map

Disused railway stations in Stirling (council area)
Railway stations in Great Britain opened in 1873
Railway stations in Great Britain closed in 1965
Beeching closures in Scotland
Former Caledonian Railway stations